Pseudoclasseya is a genus of moths of the family Crambidae.

Species
Pseudoclasseya inopinata Bassi, 1989
Pseudoclasseya minuta Bassi, 1989
Pseudoclasseya mirabilis Bassi, 1989
Pseudoclasseya sinuosellus (South in Leech & South, 1901)

References

Natural History Museum Lepidoptera genus database

Crambinae
Crambidae genera
Taxa named by Stanisław Błeszyński